Kurdistan Region, abbr. KRI, is an autonomous region in Iraq comprising the four Kurdish-majority governorates of Erbil, Sulaymaniyah, Duhok, and Halabja, and bordering Iran, Syria, and Turkey. The Kurdistan Region encompasses most of Iraqi Kurdistan but excludes the disputed territories of Northern Iraq, contested between the Kurdistan Regional Government and the central Iraqi government in Baghdad since 1992 when autonomy was realized. The Kurdistan Region Parliament is situated in Erbil, but the constitution of the Kurdistan Region declares the disputed city of Kirkuk to be the capital of the Kurdistan Region. When the Iraqi Army withdrew from most of the disputed areas in mid-2014 following the Islamic State’s invasion of Iraq,  Kurdish Forces entered the areas and held control there until Iraq retook the areas in October 2017.

Throughout the 20th century, Kurds in Iraq oscillated between fighting for autonomy and for independence. Kurds experienced Arabization and genocide at the hands of Ba'athist Iraq. Protection afforded by the Iraqi no-fly zones over most of Iraqi Kurdistan after March 1991 gave Iraqi Kurds a chance to experiment with self-governance and the autonomous region was de facto established. The Iraqi government only recognized the autonomy of the Kurdistan Region after the fall of Saddam Hussein's regime, through a new Iraqi constitution adopted in 2005. A non-binding independence referendum was passed in September 2017, to mixed reactions internationally. The Kurdistan Region largely escaped the privations of the last years of Saddam Hussein's rule and the chaos that followed his ousting in 2003, and built a parliamentary democracy with a growing economy.

History

Early struggle for autonomy (1923–1975)
Before Iraq became an independent state in 1923, the Iraqi Kurds had already begun their independence struggle from the British Mandatory Iraq with the Mahmud Barzanji revolts, which were subsequently crushed by the United Kingdom after a bombing campaign against Kurdish civilians by the Royal Air Force. Nonetheless, the Kurdish struggle persisted and the Barzani tribe had by the early 1920s gained momentum for the Kurdish nationalist cause and would become pivotal in the Kurdish-Iraqi wars throughout the 20th century. In 1943, the Barzani chief Mustafa Barzani began raiding Iraqi police stations in Kurdistan, which led the Baghdad government to deploy 30,000 troops to the region. The Iraqi Kurdish leadership fled to Iran in 1945. There, Mustafa Barzani founded the Kurdistan Democratic Party, and Iran and the Soviet Union began assisting the Kurdish rebels with arms. Israel began assisting the Kurdish rebels in the early 1960s.

From 1961 to 1970, the Kurds fought the Iraqi government in the First Iraqi–Kurdish War, which resulted in the Iraqi–Kurdish Autonomy Agreement. But simultaneously with its promise of Kurdish autonomy, the Iraqi government began ethnic cleansing Kurdish-populated areas, to reduce the size of the autonomous entity which a census would determine. This mistrust provoked the Second Iraqi–Kurdish War between 1974 and 1975, which resulted in a serious defeat for the Iraqi Kurds (see Algiers Accord) and forced all of the rebels to flee once more to Iran.

Insurgency and first elections (1975–1992)
The more left-leaning Patriotic Union of Kurdistan (PUK) was founded in 1975 by Jalal Talabani and regenerated the Kurdish insurgency with guerrilla warfare tactics as the Kurdistan Democratic Party (KDP) was slowly recovering from their defeat. However, the Kurdish insurgency became entangled in the Iran–Iraq War from 1980 onwards. During the first years of the war in the early 1980s, the Iraqi government tried to accommodate the Kurds in order to focus on the war against Iran. In 1983, the Patriotic Union of Kurdistan agreed to cooperate with Baghdad, but the Kurdistan Democratic Party remained opposed. In 1983, Saddam Hussein signed an autonomy agreement with Jalal Talabani of the PUK, though Saddam later reneged on the agreement.

By 1985, the PUK and KDP had joined forces, and Iraqi Kurdistan saw widespread guerrilla warfare up to the end of the war. On 15 March 1988, PUK forces captured the town of Halabja near the Iranian border and inflicted heavy losses among Iraqi soldiers. The Iraqis retaliated the following day by chemically bombing the town, killing about 5,000 civilians. This led the Americans and the Europeans to implement the Iraqi no-fly zones in March 1991 to protect the Kurds, thereby facilitating Kurdish autonomy amid the vacuum and the first Kurdish elections were consequently held in May 1992, wherein the Kurdistan Democratic Party secured 45.3% of the vote and a majority of seats.

Nascent autonomy, war and political turmoil (1992–2009)

The two parties agreed to form the first Kurdish cabinet led by PUK politician Fuad Masum as Prime Minister in July 1992 and the main focus of the new cabinet was to mitigate the effect of the American-led sanctions on Iraq and to prevent internal Kurdish skirmishes. Nonetheless, the cabinet broke down due to plagues of embattlement and technocracy which disenfranchised the Patriotic Union of Kurdistan and a new more partisan cabinet was formed and led by PUK politician Kosrat Rasul Ali in April 1993. The KDP-PUK relations quickly deteriorated and the first clashes in the civil war took place in May 1994 when PUK captured the towns of Shaqlawa and Chamchamal from KDP, which in turn pushed PUK out of Salahaddin (near Erbil). In September 1998, the United States mediated a ceasefire and the two warring parties signed the Washington Agreement deal, where in it was stipulated that the two parties would agree on revenue-sharing, power-sharing and security arrangements.

The anarchy in Kurdistan during the war created an opportunity for the Kurdistan Workers' Party (PKK), which created bases in the northern mountainous areas of the Kurdistan Region, which still operates in the Region in the 2010s with frequent calls for withdrawal.

In advance of the Iraq war in 2003, the two parties united in the negotiations with the Arab opposition to Saddam Hussein and succeeded in harvesting political, economic, and security gains and the Arab opposition agreed to recognize Kurdish autonomy in the case that Saddam Hussein was removed from power. America and Kurdistan also jointly rooted out the Islamist Ansar al-Islam group in Halabja area as Kurdistan hosted thousands of soldiers. The Kurdish autonomy which had existed since 1992 was formally recognized by the new Iraqi government in 2005 in the new Iraqi constitution and the KDP- and PUK-administered areas reunified in 2006, making the Kurdistan Region into one single administration. This reunification prompted Kurdish leaders and the Kurdish President Masoud Barzani to focus on bringing the Kurdish areas outside of the Kurdistan Region into the region and building healthy institutions.

In 2009, Kurdistan saw the birth of a new major party, the Gorran Movement, which was founded because of tensions in PUK and would subsequently weaken the party profoundly. The second most important political PUK figure, Nawshirwan Mustafa, was the founder of Gorran, who took advantage of sentiments among many PUK politicians critical of the cooperation with the KDP. Gorran would subsequently win 25 seats (or 23.7% of the votes) in the 2009 parliamentary elections to the detriment of the Kurdistan List. In the aftermath of the elections, Gorran failed at its attempts to persuade the Kurdistan Islamic Group and Kurdistan Islamic Union to leave the Kurdistan List, provoking both KDP and PUK. Gorran also attempted to create goodwill with the Iraqi Prime Minister Nouri al-Maliki, which only aggravated the situation in Kurdistan, and the KDP and PUK chose to boycott Gorran from politics.

ISIL and rapprochement with Iraq (after 2014)
In the period leading up to the ISIL invasion of Iraq in June 2014, the Iraqi-Kurdish relations were in a decline that the war against the Islamic State of Iraq and the Levant (ISIL) only worsened. When Iraqi forces withdrew from the Syrian-Iraqi border and away from the disputed areas, the Kurdistan Region consequently had a 1,000 km front with ISIL, which put the region into an economic stalemate. However, Kurdistan did not compromise on their stance regarding financial independence from Baghdad. Due to the Iraqi withdrawal, Kurdish Peshmerga took control of most disputed areas, including Kirkuk, Khanaqin, Jalawla, Bashiqa, Sinjar and Makhmur. The strategically important Mosul Dam was also captured by Kurdish forces. However, the control was only temporary as Iraqi forces retook control over most of the disputed areas in October 2017, after the 2017 Kurdistan Region independence referendum. As of 2019, the Kurdistan Region and the Federal Government in Baghdad are negotiating joint control over the disputed areas as their relations have become more cordial in the aftermath of ISIL's defeat.

Geography 

The Kurdistan region of Iraq is an autonomous region in northern Iraq. It borders Iran in the east, Turkey in the north, and Syria in the west. The region encompasses most of Iraqi Kurdistan, which is the southern part of the greater geographical region of Kurdistan. The region lies between latitudes 34° and 38°N, and longitudes 41° and 47°E.
Most of the northern and northeastern parts of the region are mountainous, especially those bordering Turkey and Iran. The region has several high mountains and mountain ranges. Other areas of the region are hills and plains, which make up the central and most southern parts of the region.

Most of the precipitation there falls as rain or snow between November and April, annual precipitation ranges from about 375 to 724 mm. From ancient times this has made cultivation of winter crops (and vegetables and fruit in the summer) and the raising of livestock possible.

Around 1,368,388 hectares (33%) of the land is rainfed arable agricultural land and 328,428 hectares (8%) is Irrigated arable agricultural land.

Climate 
The climate of the Kurdistan Region is semi-arid continental; hot and dry in summer, and cold and wet in winter. The region is cooler compared to the central and southern parts of Iraq.

Summers are hot and dry, with high average temperatures ranging from 35 °C (95 °F) in the cooler northernmost areas to blistering 40 °C (104 °F) in the southwest, with lows around 21 °C (70 °F) to 24 °C (75 °F). Winter is dramatically cooler than the rest of Iraq, with highs averaging between 9 °C (48 °F) and 11 °C (52 °F) and with lows hovering around 3 °C (37 °F) in some areas and freezing in others, dipping to −2 °C (28 °F) and 0 °C (32 °F) on average.

Biodiversity 
Vegetation in the region includes Abies cilicica, Quercus calliprinos, Quercus brantii, Quercus infectoria, Quercus ithaburensis, Quercus macranthera, Cupressus sempervirens, Platanus orientalis, Pinus brutia, Juniperus foetidissima, Juniperus excelsa, Juniperus oxycedrus, Salix alba, Olea europaea, Ficus carica, Populus euphratica, Populus nigra, Crataegus monogyna, Crataegus azarolus, cherry plum, rose hips, pistachio trees, pear and Sorbus graeca. The desert in the south is mostly steppe and would feature xeric plants such as palm trees, tamarix, date palm, fraxinus, poa, white wormwood and chenopodiaceae.

Animals found in the region include the Syrian brown bear, wild boar, gray wolf, golden jackal, Indian crested porcupine, red fox, goitered gazelle, Eurasian otter, striped hyena, Persian fallow deer, onager, mangar and the Euphrates softshell turtle.

Bird species include, the see-see partridge, Menetries's warbler, western jackdaw, Red-billed chough, hooded crow, European nightjar, rufous-tailed scrub robin, masked shrike and the pale rockfinch.

Government and politics

The Kurdistan Region is a democratic parliamentary republic and has a presidential system wherein the President is elected by Parliament for a four-year term. In case of extensions of parliament's term, the president's term is also automatically extended. The current President is Nechirvan Barzani who assumed office on 1 June 2019. The Kurdistan Parliament has 111 seats and are held every fifth year.

The Carnegie Middle East Center wrote in August 2015 that:

Disputed areas

The Committee for implementing article 140 defines the disputed territories as those areas Arabised and whose border modified between 17 July 1968 and 9 April 2003. Those areas include parts of four governorates of pre-1968 borders.

Disputed internal Kurdish–Iraqi boundaries have been a core concern for Arabs and Kurds, especially since US invasion and political restructuring in 2003. Kurds gained territory to the south of Iraqi Kurdistan after the US-led invasion in 2003 to regain what land they considered historically theirs.

Foreign relations

Despite being landlocked, the Kurdistan Region pursues a proactive foreign policy, which includes strengthening diplomatic relations with Iran, Russia, United States and Turkey. 29 countries have a diplomatic presence in the Kurdistan Region, while the Kurdistan Region has representative offices in 14 countries.

Administrative divisions
 
The Kurdistan Region is divided into four governorates (Parêzga): the governorates of Erbil, Sulaymaniyah, Duhok, and Halabja. Each of these governorates is divided into districts, for a total of 26 districts. Each district is also divided into sub-districts. Each governorate has a capital city, while districts and sub-districts have 'district centers'.

Economy
 

The Kurdistan Region has the lowest poverty rates in Iraq and the stronger economy of the Kurdistan Region attracted around 20,000 workers from other parts of Iraq between 2003 and 2005.  The number of millionaires in the city of Sulaymaniyah grew from 12 to 2,000 in 2003, reflecting the economic growth. According to some estimates, the debt of the Kurdish government reached $18 billion by January 2016.

The economy of Kurdistan is dominated by the oil industry. However, Kurdish officials have since the late 2010s attempted to diversify the economy to mitigate a new economic crisis like the one which hit the region during the fight against ISIL. Major oil export partners include Israel, Italy, France and Greece.

Petroleum and mineral resources
KRG-controlled parts of Iraqi Kurdistan contain 4 billion barrels of proven oil reserves. Extraction of these reserves began in 2007.

In November 2011, Exxon challenged the Iraqi central government's authority with the signing of oil and gas contracts for exploration rights to six parcels of land in Kurdistan, including one contract in the disputed territories, just east of the Kirkuk mega-field.  This act caused Baghdad to threaten to revoke Exxon's contract in its southern fields, most notably the West-Qurna Phase 1 project. Exxon responded by announcing its intention to leave the West-Qurna project.

Notable companies active in Kurdistan include Exxon, TotalEnergies, Chevron, Talisman Energy, DNO, MOL Group, Genel Energy, Hunt Oil, Gulf Keystone Petroleum, and Marathon Oil.

Other mineral resources that exist in significant quantities in the region include coal, copper, gold, iron, limestone (which is used to produce cement), marble, and zinc. The world's largest deposit of rock sulfur is located just southwest of Erbil.

In July 2012, Turkey and the Kurdistan Regional Government signed an agreement by which Turkey will supply the KRG with refined petroleum products in exchange for crude oil. Crude deliveries are expected to occur on a regular basis.

Demographics
Due to the lack of a proper census, the exact population and demographics of Kurdistan Region are unknown, but the government has started to publish more detailed figures. The population of the region is notoriously difficult to ascertain, as the Iraqi government has historically sought to minimize the importance of the Kurdish minority while Kurdish groups have had a tendency to exaggerate the numbers. Based on available data, Kurdistan has a young population with an estimated 36% of the population being under the age of 15.

Ethnic data (1917–1947)

Religion

Kurdistan has a religiously diverse population. The dominant religion is Islam, which is professed by the majority of Kurdistan Region's inhabitants. These include Kurds, Iraqi Turkmen, and Arabs, belonging mostly to the Shafi'i school of Sunni Islam. There is also a small number of Shia Feyli Kurds.

In 2015, the Kurdistan Regional Government enacted a law to formally protect religious minorities. Christianity is professed by Assyrians and Armenians.

Yazidis make up a significant minority, with some 650,000 in 2005, or 560,000 as of 2013, The Yarsan (Ahl-e Haqq or Kakai) religion numbers around 200,000 adherents respectively. In 2020, it was reported that 60 Zoroastrian families live in Iraqi Kurdistan. The first Zoroastrian temple was opened in the city of Sulaymaniyah (Silêmanî) in September 2016.

A tiny ethno-religious community of Mandaeans also exists within the semi-autonomous region. The National Association of Jews from Kurdistan in Israel stated there is a small number of expatriate Jews in the Kurdistan Region, but no Jews remaining from original Jewish communities.

Immigration
Widespread economic activity between the Kurdistan Region and Turkey has given the opportunity for Kurds in Turkey to seek jobs in the Kurdistan Region. A Kurdish newspaper based in the Kurdish capital estimates that around 50,000 Kurds from Turkey are now living in the Kurdistan Region.

Refugees

The Kurdistan Region is hosting 1.2 million displaced Iraqis who have been displaced by the ISIS war, as of early December 2017. There were about 335,000 in the area prior to 2014 with the rest arriving in 2014 as a result of unrest in Syria and attacks by the Islamic State.

Education

Before the establishment of the Kurdistan Regional Government, primary and secondary education was almost entirely taught in Arabic. Higher education was always taught in Arabic. This however changed with the establishment of the Kurdistan Autonomous Region. The first international school, the International School of Choueifat opened its branch in the Kurdistan Region in 2006. Other international schools have opened and British International Schools in Kurdistan is the latest with a planned opening in Suleimaniah in September 2011.

The Kurdistan Region's official universities are listed below, followed by their English acronym (if commonly used), internet domain, establishment date and latest data about the number of students.

Human resources 
Iraqi Kurdistan has been investing in the growth of its human capital in general. Public sector employees are often enrolled in local training programmes or sent overseas to participate in training courses, technical classes, and professional development programmes. However, factors such as the lack of a practical and formal HRD framework specific to the KRG's public sector, the absence of evaluation process, inadequate civil service training institutions, and corruption have hampered effective and efficient professional development and training in the public sector. Therefore, an assessment of such programmes and their outcomes is needed to identify any misuse of public funds, as well as to assist in the reducing of administrative and political corruption and to make policy recommendations. The government's policies for the public sector have also had an impact on the private sector. However, the government has played a much smaller role in the private sector. In Iraqi Kurdistan, the Ministry of Planning has primarily concentrated on activating training in the public sector, with the goal of expanding opportunities and improving the efficiency of the training process. In the long run, this will have an effect on private sector training and growth.

Human rights
In 2010 Human Rights Watch reported that journalists in the Kurdistan Region who criticize the regional government have faced substantial violence, threats, and lawsuits, and some have fled the country. Some journalists faced trial and threats of imprisonment for their reports about corruption in the region.

In 2009 Human Rights Watch found that some health providers in Iraqi Kurdistan had been involved in both performing and promoting misinformation about the practice of female genital mutilation. Girls and women receive conflicting and inaccurate messages from media campaigns and medical personnel on its consequences. The Kurdistan parliament in 2008 passed a draft law outlawing the practice, but the ministerial decree necessary to implement it, expected in February 2009, was cancelled.  As reported to the Centre for Islamic Pluralism by the non-governmental organization, called as Stop FGM in Kurdistan, the Kurdistan Regional Government in northern Iraq, on 25 November, officially admitted the wide prevalence in the territory of female genital mutilation (FGM). Recognition by the KRG of the frequency of this custom among Kurds came during a conference program commemorating the International Day for the Elimination of Violence Against Women. On 27 November 2010, the Kurdish government officially admitted to violence against women in Kurdistan and began taking serious measures. 21 June 2011 The Family Violence Bill was approved by the Kurdistan Parliament, it includes several provisions criminalizing the practice. A 2011 Kurdish law criminalized FGM practice in Iraqi Kurdistan and law was accepted four years later. The studies have shown that there is a trend of general decline of FGM.

British lawmaker Robert Halfon sees the Kurdistan Region as a more progressive Muslim region than the other Muslim countries in the Middle East.

Although the Kurdish regional parliament has officially recognized ethnic minorities such as Assyrians, Turkmen, Arabs, Armenians, Mandaeans, Shabaks and Yazidis, there have been accusations of Kurdish discrimination against those groups. The Assyrians have reported Kurdish officials' reluctance in rebuilding Assyrian villages in their region while constructing more settlements for the Kurds affected during the Anfal campaign. After his visit to the region, Dutch politician Joël Voordewind noted that the positions reserved for minorities in the Kurdish parliament were appointed by Kurds as the Assyrians for example had no possibility to nominate their own candidates.

The Kurdish regional government has also been accused of trying to Kurdify other regions such as the Nineveh Plains and Kirkuk by providing financial support for Kurds who want to settle in those areas.

While Kurdish forces held the city of Kirkuk, Kurdish authorities attempted to Kurdify the city. Turkmen and Arab residents in Kirkuk experienced intimidation, harassment and were forced to leave their homes, in order to increase the Kurdish demographic in Kirkuk and bolster their claims to the city. Multiple Human Rights Watch reports detail the confiscation of Turkmen and Arab families' documents, preventing them from voting, buying property and travelling. Turkmen residents of Kirkuk were detained by Kurdish forces and compelled to leave the city. Kurdish authorities expelled hundreds of Arab families from the city, demolishing their homes in the process.

United Nations reports since 2006 have documented that Kurdish authorities and Peshmerga militia forces were illegally policing Kirkuk and other disputed areas, and that these militia have abducted Turkmen and Arabs, subjecting them to torture.

In April 2016, Human Rights Watch wrote that the Kurdish security force of KRG, the Asayish, blocked the roads to Erbil to prevent Assyrians from holding a protest. According to demonstrators, the reason for the blocked protest was that Kurds in the Nahla Valley, mainly populated by Assyrians, encroached on land owned by Assyrians, without any action by courts or officials to remove the structures the Kurds built there.

In February 2017, Human Rights Watch said Kurdistan Regional Government (KRG) forces are detaining men and boys who have fled the fighting in Mosul even after they have passed security checks. Detainees were held for up to four months without any communication with their families. Relatives of these men and boys said that KRG and Iraqi forces didn't inform them of the places of their detained relatives and didn't facilitate any contact with them.

Human Rights Watch reported that Kurdistan Regional Government security forces and local police detained 32 unarmed protesters in Erbil on March 4, 2017, at a peaceful demonstration against recent clashes in Sinjar. 23 of them were released at the same day and 3 more within four days, but 6, all foreign nationals, are still being held. A police chief ordered one protester who was released to permanently leave Erbil, where he was living. While in detention, protesters were not allowed to contact with anyone or have access to a lawyer.

In 2017, Assyrian activists Juliana Taimoorazy and Matthew Joseph accused the Kurdistan Regional Government of issuing threats of violence against Assyrians living in the area who protested its independence referendum. These accusations were later confirmed when the KDP-controlled provincial council of Alqosh issued a statement warning residents that they would face consequences for protesting the referendum.

In 2010, it was reported that passing of a new law in Iraqi Kurdistan, guaranteeing “gender equality”, has deeply outraged some local religious community, including the minister of endowments and religious affairs and prominent imams, who interpreted the phrase as "legitimizing homosexuality in Kurdistan". Kamil Haji Ali, the minister of endowments and religious affairs, said in this regard that the new law would “spread immorality” and “distort” Kurdish society. Following an outrage of religious movements, the KRG held a press conference, where the public were ensured that gender equality did not include giving marriage rights to homosexuals, whose existence is effectively invisible in Iraq due to restrictive traditional rules.

In the disputed areas of Sinjar and the Nineveh Plains, the Kurdistan Regional Government has been accused by the native Assyrian and Yazidi inhabitants of forcefully disarming them with the guarantee of protection in order to justify the Peshmerga’s presence in those regions. In 2014, when the Islamic State invaded Northern Iraq, the Peshmerga abandoned their posts in these areas without notifying the locals.

Infrastructure and transportation

Infrastructure
Due to the devastation of the campaigns of the Iraqi army under Saddam Hussein and other former Iraqi regimes, the Kurdistan Region's infrastructure was never able to modernize. After the 1991 safe haven was established, the Kurdistan Regional Government began projects to reconstruct the Kurdistan Region. Since then, of all the 4,500 villages that were destroyed by Saddam Husseins' regime, 65% have been reconstructed by the KRG.

Transportation

Iraqi Kurdistan can be reached by land and air. By land, Iraqi Kurdistan can be reached most easily by Turkey through the Habur Border Gate which is the only border gate between Iraqi Kurdistan and Turkey. This border gate can be reached by bus or taxi from airports in Turkey as close as the Mardin or Diyarbakir airports, as well as from Istanbul or Ankara. Iraqi Kurdistan has two border gates with Iran, the Haji Omaran border gate and the Bashmeg border gate near the city of Sulaymaniyah. Iraqi Kurdistan has also a border gate with Syria known as the Faysh Khabur border gate. From within Iraq, the Kurdistan Region can be reached by land from multiple roads.

Iraqi Kurdistan has opened its doors to the world by opening two international airports. Erbil International Airport and Sulaimaniyah International Airport, which both operate flights to Middle Eastern and European destinations. The KRG spent millions of dollars on the airports to attract international carriers, and currently Turkish Airlines, Austrian Airlines, Lufthansa, Etihad, Royal Jordanian, Emirates, Gulf Air, Middle East Airlines, Atlas Jet, and Fly Dubai all service the region. There are at least 2 military airfields in Iraqi Kurdistan.

Culture and Society

Languages 
Kurdistan Region is a multilingual region with several languages and dialects. The majority of the people speak Kurdish in its various dialects. The two main Kurdish dialects in the region are Central Kurdish (Sorani) and Northern Kurdish (Kurmanji), other Kurdish dialects and languages spoken in the region by small communities are Hawrami Kurdish, Southern Kurdish, Arabic, Assyrian, Armenian, and Turkmen.

See also 
 List of populated places in Kurdistan Region

Notes

References

 

Autonomous regions
Kurdistan
States and territories established in 1992